Ward 6 York Centre is a municipal electoral division in Toronto, Ontario that has been represented in the Toronto City Council since the 2018 municipal election. It was last contested in 2018, with James Pasternak elected councillor for the 2018–2022 term.

History 
The ward was created in 2018 when the provincial government aligned Toronto's then-44 municipal wards with the 25 corresponding provincial and federal ridings. The current ward is an amalgamation of the old Ward 9 and the old Ward 10.

2018 municipal election 
Ward 6 York Centre was first contested during the 2018 municipal election. The Ward 9 incumbent, Maria Augimeri, ran against Ward 10 incumbent James Pasternak and two other candidates. Pasternak was ultimately elected with 47.61 per cent of the vote.

Geography 
Despite its name, Ward 6 York Centre is part of the North York community council, and does not form part of the former city of York.

York Centre is bounded on the north by Steeles Avenue (the city limit), and on the east, south and west by a line drawn from the city limit south along Yonge Street, west along the hydroelectric transmission line north of Finch Avenue, south along Bathurst Street, southeast along the Don River West Branch, southwest and west along Highway 401, north along Jane Street, east along Sheppard Avenue, northwest along Black Creek, east along Grandravine Drive, and north along Keele Street to the city limit.

Councillors

Election results

See also 

 Municipal elections in Canada
 Municipal government of Toronto
 List of Toronto municipal elections

References

External links 

 Councillor's webpage

Toronto city council wards
North York
2018 establishments in Ontario